Law of the Ranger is a 1937 American Western film directed by Spencer Gordon Bennet and written by Nate Gatzert. The film stars Robert Allen, Elaine Shepard, John Merton, Wally Wales, Lafe McKee and Tom London. The film was released on May 11, 1937, by Columbia Pictures.

Plot

Cast          
Robert Allen as Bob Allen 
Elaine Shepard as Evelyn Polk
John Merton as Bill Nash
Wally Wales as Wally Hood
Lafe McKee as Mr. Polk
Tom London as Pete
Slim Whitaker as Steve 
Ernie Adams as Zeke
Lane Chandler as Cal Williams

References

External links
 

1937 films
1930s English-language films
American Western (genre) films
1937 Western (genre) films
Columbia Pictures films
Films directed by Spencer Gordon Bennet
American black-and-white films
1930s American films